Zeitoun ( meaning olives), also al-Zeitoun, is one of the eight districts that make up the Northern Area in Cairo, Egypt. It has been made famous for its Marian apparitions at the Coptic Church of the Virgin Mary of Zeitoun during the years 1968–1971.

History
Until the First World War, the area was cultivated fields known as 'Izbet al-Zeitoun (Olive Estate), skirting the Eastern Desert just north of Cairo, and to the east of the then-new Heliopolis suburb. While Egypt was under British occupation, the Imperial School of Instruction was built there, and New Zealand troops camped in the desert during the war.

As Cairo expanded, Tawfiq Khalil Bey a real estate developer, bought land there and subdivided it into a suburb named Zeitoun. He also built a church that housed a masoleum for his father, Khalil Ibrahim Pasha, in response to an appearance of The Virgin Mary. Years later it would be known for a series of Marian apparitions.

Notable people
It was the birthplace of Fathia Nkrumah (born Fathia Rizk to a Coptic family), wife of Kwame Nkrumah, the first President of Ghana.

See also
Zeitoun District official page
Church of the Virgin Mary (Zeitoun)

References

Shrines to the Virgin Mary
Districts of Cairo